The ZRE Katowice Bytom Open (former Polska Energia Open) is a professional tennis tournament played on outdoor red clay courts. It is currently part of the Association of Tennis Professionals (ATP) Challenger Tour. It is held annually in Bytom, Poland, since 2007.

Past finals

Singles

Doubles

External links
ITF search

 
ATP Challenger Tour
Clay court tennis tournaments
Tennis tournaments in Poland